Raphael Cheenath (29 December 1934 – 14 August 2016) was the archbishop of Cuttack-Bhubaneswar, India. He was ordained as a priest of the Society of the Divine Word on 21 September 1963 and appointed bishop of Sambalpur, India on 28 February 1974. He was appointed as archbishop of Cuttack-Bhubaneswar on 1 July 1985 and retired on 11 February 2011. Cheenath died on 14 August 2016 at Holy Spirit Hospital in Mumbai.

References

External links

1934 births
2016 deaths
20th-century Roman Catholic archbishops in India
21st-century Roman Catholic archbishops in India
Divine Word Missionaries Order